The attorney-general of Singapore is the public prosecutor of the Republic of Singapore, and legal adviser to the Government of Singapore. The functions of the attorney-general are carried out with the assistance of the deputy attorney-general and the solicitor-general, through the Attorney-General's Chambers (AGC). The attorney-general is appointed by the president, on the advice of the prime minister, under Article 35 of the Constitution of Singapore. Unlike some countries that follow the Westminster parliamentary model, the attorney-general is not a Member of Parliament (MP).

The office of Attorney-General was established in 1867, when the British Crown appointed the attorney-general of the Straits Settlements, based in Singapore, to serve as legal adviser to the new Crown colony's government.

Functions

The attorney-general of Singapore has two distinct roles: legal adviser to the Singapore Government; and public prosecutor, assisted by legal officers in the four divisions under the Attorney-General's Chambers (AGC).

Legal Adviser to the Government
The attorney-general's role as the Government's legal adviser is performed by the AGC's Civil Division. The functions of the attorney-general include advising ministries and organs of state on legal matters, drafting and vetting contracts and legal documents and representing the Government in international initiatives and litigation matters, among others. He is also the Protector of Charities.

The International Affairs Division advises Government agencies on international-law issues, represents Singapore in bilateral and multilateral negotiations, and negotiates and drafts multilateral and bilateral legal instruments, among other roles.

The Legislation Division comprises four groups. The Law Drafting Group drafts legislation and advises Government agencies on development of legislation. The Legislative Editorial and Revision Group undertakes law revision. The Law Publication Group maintains Singapore Statutes Online, among other duties. The Business Services and Governance Group provides administrative support to the other groups.

Public Prosecutor
The attorney-general's role as the public prosecutor is performed by the AGC's Crime Division. Prosecutorial discretion grants the attorney-general the power to institute, conduct or discontinue any prosecution at the attorney-general's discretion.

In criminal law, it is the role of the prosecution to discharge its burden, a must to first prove its case in a court of law against the accused beyond reasonable doubt. In general, it is not for the accused to prove his innocence, since the accused is innocent until proven guilty beyond reasonable doubt.

History

Pre-1867

Between the grant of the Second Charter of Justice in 1826 and the formation of the Crown colony of the Straits Settlements in 1867, the function of legal adviser to the government in Singapore was vested in various offices. From 1826 to 1855, it was the Recorder of the Prince of Wales Island, Malacca and Singapore; from 1855 to 1864, the Recorder of Singapore; and from 1864 to 1867, the Crown Counsel, Singapore.

1867–1942: Attorney-General of the Straits Settlements
The office of Attorney-General was created on 1 April 1867, when Sir Thomas Braddell was appointed as the first attorney-general of the Straits Settlements. He was based in Singapore while his solicitor-general, Daniel Logan, was based in Penang.

1942–1945: Japanese occupation of Singapore
Following the fall of Singapore on 15 February 1942, Japanese troops arrested the attorney-general, Charles Gough Howell, who died in Japanese captivity. Concurrently, the civilian courts ceased to function.

Subsequently, the Japanese military administration established the office of Kensatsu-kan, or Attorney-General and Public Prosecutor, presumably on 27 May 1942 when the civilian courts were re-opened by proclamation.

1945–1946: British Military Administration
Following the formal surrender of Japanese forces in Southeast Asia on 12 September 1945, the responsibility of rendering legal advice to the British Military Administration of Malaya lay with its Chief Legal Officer.

1946–1959: Attorney-General of the Colony of Singapore
When Singapore became a Crown colony on 1 April 1946, Sir Edward John Davies,  was appointed as the first attorney-general of the Colony of Singapore.

1959–1965: State Advocate-General of the State of Singapore
After the State of Singapore gained full internal self-governance in 1959, Ahmad Mohamed Ibrahim was appointed State Advocate-General, becoming Singapore's first non-British legal adviser to the government.

Post-1965: Attorney-General of the Republic of Singapore
Following the Republic of Singapore's independence on 9 August 1965, Ahmad Mohamed Ibrahim became the country's first attorney-general.

The appointment of Lucien Wong, as the ninth attorney-general, was debated in Parliament. He was aged 63 at the time of his appointment; the retirement age is 60 and he was older than the previous Attorney-General who retired at age 60. Minister for Law K. Shanmugam, who was a senior partner with Wong at Allen & Gledhill, argued that his appointment, being for a specified term, was “in accordance with Article 35 of the Constitution.”

Wong was previously the personal lawyer of Prime Minister Lee Hsien Loong and also advised Lee on issues relating to Lee Kuan Yew's will.

List of officeholders (1867–1965)

Attorney-General of the Straits Settlements

Kensatsu-kan of Syonan-to

Chief Legal Officer, British Military Administration of Malaya

Attorney-General of the Crown Colony of Singapore

State Advocate-General of the State of Singapore

List of attorney-generals (1965–present)

Incident

Wrongful conviction 
In September 2020, the Attorney-General Chamber's conducted a prosecutorial review for a wrongful conviction case of a maid wrongfully accused of a crime.

See also
 Chief Justice of Singapore

Notes

Bibliography

External links
List of Attorneys-General of Singapore
Attorney-General's Chambers website

 
Singapore